Jesper Helledie is a retired badminton player from Denmark. Though a highly regarded prospect in men's singles as a young player, he eventually became a doubles specialist, overcoming two ruptures of his Achilles tendon during his career.

Career
Helledie won the gold medal at the 1983 IBF World Championships in men's doubles with Steen Fladberg, defeating Mike Tredgett and Martin Dew 15-10, 15-10 in the final.

He also won at the 1986 European Badminton Championships in men's doubles with the same partner.

Major achievements

World Championships 
Men's doubles

IBF World Grand Prix 
The World Badminton Grand Prix sanctioned by International Badminton Federation (IBF) from 1983 to 2006.

Men's doubles

References

External links
Jesper Helledie's Profile - Badminton.dk

Danish male badminton players
Living people
1954 births